Vernon Lee Fox, III (born October 9, 1979) is a retired American football safety.  He was signed by the San Diego Chargers as an undrafted free agent after the 2002 NFL Draft.  He played college football at Fresno State.  Fox is currently an ordained minister and is an associate pastor in Las Vegas. In February 2013, he was hired to be head football coach and admissions counselor at Faith Lutheran Middle School and High School in Las Vegas, NV.

Fox also played for the Detroit Lions and the Washington Redskins.

Early years
Vernon Fox was born in Las Vegas, Nevada to Willette Fox and Vernon Fox II. 
He attended high school at Cimarron-Memorial in Las Vegas.

Personal life
Fox is married to Tai Fox. They have two children together. Fox is a Christian.

References

External links
Denver Broncos bio
Detroit Lions bio

1979 births
American football safeties
Denver Broncos players
Detroit Lions players
Fresno State Bulldogs football players
Living people
San Diego Chargers players
Sportspeople from Las Vegas
Washington Redskins players